Mitromorpha fuscafenestrata is a species of sea snail, a marine gastropod mollusk in the family Mitromorphidae.

Description
The length of the shell varies between 4 mm and 5.5 mm.

Distribution
This marine species occurs off the Philippines, New Caledonia, Vanuatu and Papua New Guinea

References

Description of four new shallow water Mitromorpha species from the western Pacific (Gastropoda: Mitromorphidae). Visaya 4(2):: 21–27

External links
 MNHN, Paris: Mitromorpha fuscafenestrata (holotype)
 

fuscafenestrata
Gastropods described in 2014